Daniel Carlos Martínez Villamil (born 23 February 1957) is a Uruguayan industrial engineer and politician of the Socialist Party – Broad Front.

Background
Daniel Martínez pursued a mechanical engineering career prior to taking up a ministerial post. For many years he was Vice President of the Uruguayan Engineers' Association.

He was elected Intendant of Montevideo in 2015.

He is a member of the Uruguayan Socialist Party, having been active during the period of civilian-military rule 1973–1985.

Industry Minister
From March 3, 2008 until August 31, 2009, he served as Uruguayan Minister of Industry, Energy and Mining in the government of President Tabaré Vázquez. He succeeded Jorge Lepra in that post.

Intendant of Montevideo
In the 2015 elections he was elected as Intendant of Montevideo. In April 2019 he resigned as Intendant of Montevideo to run for the Presidency and was succeeded by Christian Di Candia.

Presidential candidate
Martínez was the presidential candidate of the Broad Front for the 2019 national elections. After a very close runoff election against National Party candidate Luis Lacalle Pou, Martinez was defeated by just over 37,000 votes, and withdrew after absentee ballots were counted. He chose Graciela Villar as his running mate. On November 28, 2019, Martínez conceded defeat.

See also
 Politics of Uruguay

References

External links

Living people
1957 births
Intendants of Montevideo
Ministers of Industries, Energy and Mining of Uruguay
Uruguayan engineers
Socialist Party of Uruguay politicians

University of the Republic (Uruguay) alumni
Candidates for President of Uruguay